Mastixia nimali is a species of plant in the Nyssaceae family. It is endemic to Sri Lanka.

References

nimali
Endemic flora of Sri Lanka
Vulnerable plants
Taxonomy articles created by Polbot